Aladji Ba is a Paralympian athlete from France competing mainly in category T11 sprint events.

Aladji has competed in three Paralympics and won two bronze medals in the 400m  in 2000 and in 2004 and missing out in 2008

External links
 profile on paralympic.org 
 

Paralympic athletes of France
Athletes (track and field) at the 2000 Summer Paralympics
Athletes (track and field) at the 2004 Summer Paralympics
Athletes (track and field) at the 2008 Summer Paralympics
Paralympic bronze medalists for France
French male sprinters
Living people
Medalists at the 2000 Summer Paralympics
Medalists at the 2004 Summer Paralympics
Year of birth missing (living people)
Paralympic medalists in athletics (track and field)
Visually impaired sprinters
Paralympic sprinters
21st-century French people